Hamira is a small town in Kapurthala district, in the Indian state of Punjab, situated on National Highway No. 1. It is generally known for its alcohol factory, Jagatjit Industries.

Transport 
Hamira railway station is situated on Ambala–Attari line under Firozpur railway division of Northern Railway zone.

References

Villages in Kapurthala district